Punjabi cuisine is a culinary style originating in the Punjab, a region in the northern part of South Asia, which is now divided in an Indian part to the east and a Pakistani part to the west. This cuisine has a rich tradition of many distinct and local ways of cooking. One is a special form of tandoori cooking that is now famous in other parts of Pakistan and India, England, Canada, America, and in many other parts of the world.

The local cuisine of Punjab is heavily influenced by the agriculture and farming lifestyle prevalent from the times of the ancient Indus Valley civilization. Locally grown staple foods form the major part of the local cuisine. Distinctively Punjabi cuisine is known for its rich, buttery flavours along with the extensive vegetarian and meat dishes. Main dishes include  (a stew whose main ingredient is mustard greens) and makki di roti (flatbreads made with cornmeal).

Karrhi is a spicy, yellow gravy with cakes made of chickpea flour (besan), containing lemon juice, red pepper and turmeric. It is commonly served with rice or naan.

Basmati rice is the indigenous variety of Punjab, and various meat- and vegetable-based rice dishes have been developed using it.

Style of cooking
There are many styles of cooking in Punjab. In the villages many people still employ the traditional methods and equipment for cooking purposes. This includes wood-fired and masonry ovens. Modern methods include cooking on gas cookers. Tandoori style of cooking involves use of the tandoor. In India, tandoori cooking is traditionally associated with Punjab as Punjabis embraced the tandoor on a regional level. This style of cooking became popular throughout India after the 1947 partition when Punjabis resettled in places such as Delhi. According to Planalp (1971), "the Panjab-style underground oven known as tandur is becoming increasingly popular in New Delhi" pointing to the Punjabi style of the tandoor. In rural Punjab, it is common to have communal tandoors, which are also called Kath tadoors in Punjabi.

Staple foods

Punjab is a major producer of wheat, rice and dairy products. These products also form the staple diet of the Punjabi people. The state of Punjab has one of the highest capita usage of dairy products in India. Therefore, dairy products form an important component of Punjabi diet.

Dairy products
Dairy products are a staple in Punjabi cuisine. Both cow milk and water buffalo milk are popular. Milk is used for drinking, to add to tea or coffee, to make homemade dahi (yogurt), for butter and making traditional Punjabi cottage cheese called paneer. Traditionally, yogurt is made every day using previous day's yogurt as the starting bacterial culture to ferment the milk. Curd is used as dressing for many raita dishes, to prepare Kadhi, to prepare cultured buttermilk (Chaas), and as a side dish in a meal. Buttermilk is used in making various kinds of Lassi. It may also be used in curry preparations. Milk is also the prerequisite ingredient for butter and Ghee (clarified butter).

Food additives and condiments
Food additives and condiments are usually added to enhance the flavor of the food. Food coloring as additive is used in sweet dishes and desserts. Starch is used as a bulking agent.

Common dishes

Breakfast

Breakfast recipes with respect to different regions within Punjab varies. Common ones are chana masala, nan, chole kulche, aloo paratha, panner paratha, gobi paratha, paratha with curd, paratha with butter, halwa poori, bhatoora, falooda, makhni doodh, Amritsari lassi, masala chai, tea, Amritsari kulchas, dahi vada, dahi, khoa, paya, aloo paratha with butter, panjeeri with milk.

In the upper Punjab Pakistan the Lahori Katlama is famous for breakfast as well.

Meat
Poultry, lamb and goat meat are the preferred meat sources in different regions of Punjab.

Many dishes of meat variety is available and some of them are named below.

 Biryani: lamb and chicken
 Kebab: braised chicken or lamb meat, commonly served with naan and flat bread.
 Keema: Braised minced lamb meat, commonly served with naan.
 Lamb: including rogan josh, Bhuna Gosht, Kadhai Gosht, Raan Gosht, Dal Gosht, Saag Gosht, Nihari, Rara Gosht, Paye da Shorba
Shami kebab, chicken karahi, Amritsari tandoori chicken, Punjabi Karhi (the chicken yogurt curry of Punjab), Butter Chicken (Murgh Makhni), chicken tikka, Paye.
 Kunna Gosht, slow cooked meat prepared in Kunna (mitti ki bartan (clay utensil))
 Haleem is made of meat (beef or chicken) slow cooked with a mixture of legumes softened by overnight cooking it is a protein rich food with spices and aromatics like nutmeg served with wedge of lemon and sautéed onions.

Fish

Since Punjab is a landlocked region, freshwater fish, and not marine fish, forms an important part of the cuisine. Carp, rohu and catfish are the most commonly prepared fish. Other fish types include thela machi and tilapia. Recently shrimp has been introduced. Fish tikka is an Amritsari speciality.

Vegetarian

 Khichdi, a grain-and-lentil dish: In the Punjab, khichdi is made of millet flour, mung beans and moth lentils (Vigna aconitifolia). However, khichdi made of rice and red lentils or mung beans is also consumed.
Rajma, Rajma is the Hindi word for Red kidney beans. Beans are cooked on medium spicy onion-tomato gravy and most often served with steamed rice and sometimes with Indian flatbread called Chapati (Phulka in Punjab region).
Paneer (freshly made cottage cheese) Recipes like Shahi Paneer; Khoya Paneer, Paneer Kofta (paneer chunks battered and fried, then simmered in a spicy gravy), Amritsari Paneer, Matar Paneer (paneer with green peas), paneer paratha (wheat flatbread stuffed with paneer),Palak Paneer
 Panjiri: This is a traditional North Indian dessert and is popular in Punjab region as well. which has a generous amount of almonds, walnuts, pistachios, dry dates, cashew nuts along with whole wheat flour, sugar, edible gum, poppy seeds and fennel seeds to make the traditional dish of 'panjri' or also known as 'dabra'.
 Legumes: a variety of legumes are used, including chickpeas, pigeon peas, red lentils, mung bean, red kidney beans (originally an import from the Americas) and black gram. Legumes may be used singly or in combination like Dal Makhani
Saag: a variety of leafy greens (including spinach and mustard greens), typically cooked down to a stew, tempered with ginger, tomato, onion, garlic, chilies and other spices, and often enriched with paneer or cream. Bathua is also added to enhance the flavor. It is served with butter on top and with makki ki roti. Saag is a winter and spring delicacy; it is one of the most popular dishes of Punjab.
 Eggplant: Baingan bharta is similar to baba ghanoush in the way the eggplant is prepared by roasting and peeling the skin off, but much richer, with the incorporation of much cooked tomato, browned onion and a variety of spices instead of tahini.
 Punj Ratani Dal: A thick gravy that uses 5 legumes, with tomato, browned onion and spices.
 Punjabi Kadhi Pakora (traditional curry with rice). Kadhi is a type of curry made with yogurt or buttermilk, which is thickened with chickpea flour and seasoned with ginger, turmeric, chilies, and tempered spices. Deep-fried lumps of spiced chickpea-flour batter (pakoras) are also added.
 Punjabi Lassi paneer: In the Punjab, it is traditional to prepare lassi and then extract the paneer which would then be consumed by adding water, salt and chili. Lassi paneer can also be added to potatoes and spices to make a curry which resembles scrambled eggs. Lassi paneer cannot be cut into cubes as paneer from milk can be.

Snacks
 Toasted grains: In Punjab, toasting corn and wheat grains on the Punjabi bhathi is a traditional delicacy.
 Samosas.

Raita and chutney
Along with all types of main dishes raita or chutney is also served.

Sweets and desserts

Punjabi cuisine includes various types of desserts and Mithyai which include:
 Amritsari
 Kheer, dessert made of rice milk and dry fruits
 Khoya
 Kulfi, an ice-cream-like dessert
 Malpua
 Rabri
 Semolina-based desserts: Halva
Sheer korma
Kaju katli
Atte ka halwa
Pinni - Made with desi ghee, wheat flour, almond and jaggery
Gulab jamun
Jalebi
Burfi.

Bread
Punjabis eat a variety of breads. Flatbreads and raised breads are eaten on a daily basis. Raised breads are known as khamiri roti. Sunflower and flax seeds are also added in some breads occasionally. The breads may be made of different types of flour and can be made in various ways:
 Baked in the tandoor like naan, tandoori roti, kulcha, or lachha paratha
 Dry baked (Indian griddle),  (these are also smeared with white butter)
 Shallow fried like paratha
 Deep fried like puri, Kachori and bhatoora (a fermented dough)
 Salt-rising bread: Salt-rising bread is a unique bread found only in the Salt Range region of Punjab, Pakistan. Since rock salt is readily available in the salt range, many people in the past made use of salt instead of yeast to leaven the bread.
 Papar
  Taftan: an Iranian bread very popular in Pakistan and Lahore. It can be eaten with korma and nihari.

Herbs and spices

Indian subcontinent-based spices are used in Punjabi cuisine, which are ground in a mortar and pestle or a food processor.

Beverages
Punjab has a diverse range of beverages. Some are dairy-based such as lassi and buttermilk. Water buffalo milk-based products are especially common around Punjab. Examples are mango lassi, mango milkshake, and chaas. Others are juices derived from vegetables and fruits, such as watermelon shakes, carrot juice and tamarind juice (imli ka paani). Shikanjvi and neembu paani drinks are especially preferred during the summer. Jal-jeera is also common as well.

Sattu is a traditional North Indian drink that is also traditionally consumed in the Punjab. Sattu is made by roasting barley grains and then grinding them into powder, mixed with salt and turmeric and water.

The local regional drinks in Punjab also include Doodh soda (milk soda), Desi Dharu (a local form of alcohol in India) and Bantay (a local soda drink) in Pakistan.

Fermented foods

Fermented foods are common in Punjabi cuisine. Also fermented foods are added in the preparation of some dishes as well. Mango pickle is especially famous in many villages of Punjab.

Cooking methods

Traditional and modern methods are employed for cooking Punjabi cuisine. The traditional stoves and ovens used to cook Punjabi food include:

Chullah
The traditional name of the stove in the Punjabi language is chulla. Traditional houses also have ovens (wadda chulla or band chulla) that are made from bricks, stones, and in many cases clay. Older communities in Punjab also used earth ovens (khadda chulla), but this tradition is dying out now.

Bhathi
A masonry oven is known as a bhathi. Outdoor cooking and grilling have many different types of bhathi. A bhathi is used to roast wheat or corn for which Kalsi (1992) describes as a "special oven with an open pan in which sand is heated to roast corn."

Hara
A hara is a six-foot-tall oven with its own roof. The hara is traditionally used to slow-heat milk or slow-cook pulses such as chickpeas.

Tandoor

According to Ancient Pakistan - An Archaeological History by Mukhtar Ahmed, Harappan oven structures may have operated in a similar manner to the modern tandoors of the Punjab. The tandoor is traditionally made of clay and is a bell-shaped oven, set into the earth and fired with wood or charcoal reaching high temperatures. According to Roy Hayter the original versions of the tandoor "in the Punjab, a province in the north-west of India, were sunk neck deep in the ground". He further states that modern versions can also rest above the ground.

Modern methods
 Pressure cookers
 Iron griddle

Etiquette of Punjabi dining
 
Etiquette of eating is considered a major part of the cuisine. Every Punjabi household follows certain regional etiquette. The word etiquette has many local names depending on the particular region of Punjab. Though certain etiquette varies regionally, there are many etiquette practices that are common throughout Punjab. Communal dining is a norm in Punjabi families.

Bringing and sending fresh fruits, sweets and food items as gifts to family members is a common practice in Punjab, particularly during the spring season. Food items are distributed among neighbors as well on special occasions and as a sign to show hospitality. Mango is considered a delicacy and produced widely in Punjab, and mango parties are common during the fruit's harvest season. Watermelon and radish at food stalls are shared among friends and relatives.

Major features of etiquette

Invitation to dine 
 Invitation to a meal or tea is generally distributed few days beforehand.
 Denying the invitation for no major reason is considered a breach of etiquette.

Table manners 

 The invited guest or elder person is given special respect and attention.
 Usually the invited guest is requested to start the meal. It is considered rude if the host starts eating without taking into account the attendance of all guests.
 Table setting is done before the arrival of the guests.
 Family members or any occupants within one home make sure to eat together during the dinner.
 If any other person is present in the vicinity then they are offered meals as a way of giving respect. It is considered rude to start eating food without asking others to participate in a meal. It is customary to offer food to anyone in your vicinity before eating.
 Chewing food with one's mouth open and burping in front of others is considered rude.
 In the villages of Punjab, an additional common plate is usually placed on the table for any bones left from the consumption of bone meat. Placing leftovers on the floor or on the table floor is considered bad etiquette.

Eating utensil etiquette 

 Punjabi families use a hybrid style of South Asian and European utensil etiquette most of the times. The bread is eaten with the hands. Rice and desserts are eaten with spoons. Soup spoons are used for consuming soup and forks are used for eating noodles.

Punjabi dhaba

The roadsides often serve as suburban eatery centers. They can also be a communal place to sit and chat. Some serve on the same concept of the greasy spoon.

Punjabi Restaurants 

Punjabi cuisine has spread internationally. Punjab in London has been family-run since 1946 and is the UK's oldest North Indian restaurant. The New Punjab Club, located in Hong Kong, became the world's first Punjabi restaurant to earn One Michelin Star in 2019.

See also

 Indian cuisine
 Pakistani cuisine
 Lahori cuisine
 Punjabis

References

Punjab
 
Punjabi people
Indian cuisine
Indian cuisine by state or union territory
North Indian cuisine
Pakistani cuisine
Smoked food